Fighting Mad is a 1939 American adventure film directed by Sam Newfield and written by George Rosener and John Rathmell. It is based on the 1927 novel Renfrew Rides Again by Laurie York Erskine. The third of the Renfrew of the Royal Mounted film series stars James Newill, Sally Blane, Benny Rubin, Dave O'Brien, Milburn Stone and Walter Long. The film was released on November 5, 1939, by Monogram Pictures when Grand National Pictures ceased operation.

Plot
Ann Fenwick, a witness to a bank robbery, is abducted by the bank robbers across the border into Canada, where Sergeant Renfrew and Constable Kelly get involved.

Cast          
James Newill as Sergeant Renfrew
Sally Blane as Ann Fenwick
Benny Rubin as Benny
Dave O'Brien as Constable Kelly
Milburn Stone as Cardigan
Walter Long as Frenchy
Warner Richmond as Trigger
Ted Adams as Leon
Chief Thundercloud as Indian 
Ole Olsen as Joe
Horace Murphy as Smith

References

External links
 

1939 films
American adventure films
1939 adventure films
Monogram Pictures films
Films directed by Sam Newfield
Royal Canadian Mounted Police in fiction
Northern (genre) films
American black-and-white films
1930s English-language films
1930s American films
English-language adventure films